Lycée Polyvalent Mixte Maine de Biran is a Lycée or High School in the town of Bergerac in the Aquitaine Region of France. As a Polyvalent Lycée, the school offers students the possibility of Studying for either a général or téchnologique Baccalauréat. The school campus is located on Rue Valette in the west of the town, and is spread over more than 11 acres and includes 2 teaching buildings, 2 Dormitory buildings, a building housing two canteens, a gymnasium and an administration building . It is the biggest only Polyvalent Lycée in the south west Dordogne, excluding the nearby private school,  Institution Sainte Marthe - Saint Front on Avenue Pasteur in the north of the town. There are several other smaller Lycées in Bergerac and the surrounding towns. The estimated student body is 1700.

References 

Information translated from https://web.archive.org/web/20100722155806/http://lyceemainedebiran.fr/spip.php

External links 
  School's official website (French)

Lycées in France
Buildings and structures in Dordogne
Education in Nouvelle-Aquitaine